A hawza or ḥawzah ʿilmīyah is a seminary  where Shi'a Muslim scholars are educated.

The word ḥawzah is found in Arabic as well as the Persian language. In Arabic, the word means "to hold something firmly". Accordingly, ḥawzah ʿilmīyah would mean a place where the firm knowledge (of the Muslim religion) is acquired. In the Persian language, ḥawzah refers to the middle part of a place or an area.  Ḥawzah ʿilmīyah in Persian, therefore, means "the place of knowledge". Another meaning of the word is "circle of knowledge".

Several senior Grand Ayatollahs constitute the hawza. The institutions in Najaf, Iraq and Qom, Iran, are the preeminent seminary centers for the education of Shi'a scholars. However, several smaller hawzas exist in other cities around the world, such as at Karbala, Iraq, Isfahan and Mashhad in Iran, Beirut, Lebanon, Lucknow, India, Lahore, Pakistan, Europe and North America.

Law schools
In countries with sharia courts such as Iran, Pakistan, and Afghanistan, a hawza also functions as a law school for those wanting to practice law in Islamic courts.

Hawza 'Ilmiyya Najaf

Hawza 'Ilmiyya in Najaf, Iraq was established in 430 AH (the 11th century AD) by Shaykh al-Tusi (385 AH/995 CE – 460 AH/1067 CE), and continued as a center of study until the establishment of modern Iraq in 1921. At present Ayatollah Sistani heads Hawza 'Ilmiyya Najaf, which includes two other Ayatollahs - Mohammad Ishaq Al-Fayyad and Bashir al-Najafi. After witnessing a peak of some 20,000 students in the 60s, then around 3000 because of the State repression, since 2003, the Najaf hawza has now more than 13,000 students, while the curriculum has been updated to include many modern subjects as well as inter faith and inter sectarian initiatives.

Hawza 'Ilmiyya Qom

Although large Shi'a academies existed in Qom dating back as early as 10th century CE, the hawza of the city became prominent at the time of the Safavids when Shi'a Islam became the official religion of Iran. The famous teachers of that era included Mulla Sadra and Shaykh Bahai. The modern Qom hawza was revitalized by Abdul Karim Haeri Yazdi and Grand Ayatollah Borujerdi and is barely a century old. There are nearly three hundred thousand clerics in Iran's seminaries.

Hawza 'Ilmiyya Khwaharan (Women's Hawza)

There are also a number of women's hawza, mostly located in Iran. Already in the early 1800s, the Salehiyya madrasa in Qazvin ran a women's section where several female mujtahids were trained. In Qom, the earliest seminary for women was established by the grand ayatollah Mohammad Kazem Shariatmadari, who in 1973 added a women's section to his hawza Dar al-Tabligh, called Dar al-Zahra. Next, the Haghani school opened a women's wing in 1974/75, called Maktab-e Tawhid.

Outside Qom, women's seminaries included Maktab-e Fatema of Fasa (opened in 1961), Maktab-e Zahra of Shiraz (opened in 1964), Maktab-e Fatimah of Isfahan (opened by Lady Amin in 1965), Zahra-i Athar of Tehran (opened in 1966), and Madrase-ye ‘Elmīyya Narges of Mashhad (opened in 1966).

After the 1979 revolution in Iran, the state began to centralize the women's hawza system. The women's seminaries in Qom were centralized into one large school, the Jamiat al-Zahra. In Khorasan with its clerical center of Mashhad, the women's maktabs came under the aegis of the state-run Centre for Management of Women's Seminaries of Khorasan. In the rest of the country, women's seminaries were integrated into the Centre for Management of Women's Seminaries (Markaz-e Modiriat-e Ḥawzahā-ye ʿElmiyya Khwaharān). Since the mid-1990s the latter center has established more than 300 seminaries across Iran (before the revolution less than a dozen existed in the entire country).

Hawza subjects
Hawza students begin their studies by learning fiqh, kalam, hadith, tafsir, philosophy, natural and abstract sciences as well as Arabic and Arabic literature. Once these studies have been completed, they may begin preparation to become a mujtahid by studying advanced old textbooks known as sat'h, and research courses known as kharij.

Subjects studied at the hawza may include the following:

 Falsafa (Islamic philosophy)
 Fiqh (jurisprudence)
 'Ilm al-Hadith (traditions)
 Ilm al-Kalam (theology)
 'Ilm ar-Rijal (evaluation of biographies)
 'Irfan (Islamic mysticism)
 Mantiq (Logic)
 Lugha (language studies)
 Tafsir al-Qur'an (interpretation of the Qur'an)
 Tarikh (history)
 'Ulum al-Qur'an (Qur'an sciences)
 Usul al-Fiqh (principles of jurisprudence)

Advanced subjects
Once the basic studies have been completed, students may begin preparation to become a mujtahid by studying advanced ancient textbooks known as sat'h, and research courses known as kharij.

To be a mujtahid one has to excel in the advanced levels of the Hawza including Muqad'dim'maat, Sotooh, Sotooh 'Ulya,  'Uloom ukhra and Bahath Kharij.

Bahath e Kharij is the last level of hawzah and this level leads to Marja'iya, to become a marja' one has to teach dars e khaarij for considerable amount of time, publish collection of juridical edicts (risala ‘amaliyya) and become recognised as one (by established Maraji).

See also

Marja'
Lists of Maraji
List of current Maraji
Qom Seminary
Society of Seminary Teachers of Qom
Hawza Najaf

References

External links

Al-Mahdi Institute Hawza Programme, Birmingham, UK
Towards an Understanding of the Shiite Authoritative Sources
Hawza Ilmiyya, Qom, Iran
Research centre of Hawza Ilmiyya, Qom, Iran 

Imam Hossain University (Howza)
Alqaem Institute
Hawza - Advanced Islamic Studies

 
Islamic education
Islamic terminology
Lists of law schools
Single-gender schools